Bob Lee Kelly (August 18, 1938 – December 18, 2014) was an American football offensive lineman and defensive lineman in the American Football League (AFL) for the Houston Oilers, the Kansas City Chiefs and the Cincinnati Bengals.

Kelly played college football at New Mexico State University.  After his Professional Football career, he coached the Hughes High School football team in Cincinnati for 27 years.

See also
 Other American Football League players

References

1938 births
2014 deaths
American football offensive tackles
Houston Oilers players
Kansas City Chiefs players
Cincinnati Bengals players
New Mexico State Aggies football players
Players of American football from New Mexico
People from Carlsbad, New Mexico
American Football League players